St. Margaret Queen of Scotland Catholic Church is a parish of the Roman Catholic Church serving eastern Livingston Parish, Louisiana. It is particularly noted for its historic parish church located at 30300 Catholic Hall Road in Hammond, Louisiana. Consecrated in 1912, it represented, along with the Hungarian Presbyterian Church, the center of community activities in Albany, Louisiana.

Architecture
Built in 1910, the church is a frame Gothic Revival building featuring a basilican plan with a central entrance tower surmounted by a belfry and a spire. A certain number of alterations have occurred during the years, like the exterior being completely sheathed in aluminium siding and the addition of a small rear wing. It was listed on the National Register of Historic Places on January 28, 1992.

See also
National Register of Historic Places listings in Livingston Parish, Louisiana

References

Roman Catholic churches in Louisiana
Churches on the National Register of Historic Places in Louisiana
Carpenter Gothic church buildings in Louisiana
Roman Catholic churches completed in 1912
Churches in Livingston Parish, Louisiana
National Register of Historic Places in Livingston Parish, Louisiana
20th-century Roman Catholic church buildings in the United States